Afzaal Ahmad ( died 2 December 2022) was a Pakistani actor. He came into limelight with his roles in the following movies: International Gorillay, Aakhri Muqabala and London.

Life and career 
Afzaal Ahmad had over four decades of an acting career. He started in the 1970s by featuring in Dhiyan Namanian. Over the years he featured in over two hundred movies that cut across Urdu, Punjabi and Pashto.

On 2 December 2022, Ahmad died at Lahore General Hospital after suffering from a brain haemorrhage.

Selected filmography 
Afzaal Ahmad has featured in the following selected films; 
 Khatarnak (1974 film) (1974)
Aakhri Muqabala (1977)
London (1981)
Sharif Badmaash, 
Vahshi Jutt, 
Doorian (1984)
Chen Wariam,
Revenge of Oppression,
Gorillay (1990), 
 Mangal Dada (1991)
Billu Badmash (1991)
Jagga Daku (1993)
Ruqqa (1993)
Mr. Charlie (1993)
 Laila (1994)
 Sarak (1995)
 Raja Sahib (1996)
 Ek Pagal Si Larki (1999)
Dhamki
 Shareeka (2012)

References

External links

20th-century births
2022 deaths
Pakistani male actors
Year of birth unknown
Place of birth missing
20th-century Pakistani male actors
21st-century Pakistani male actors